The Trambaix is one of Barcelona's three tram systems. It is operated by TRAMMET connecting the Baix Llobregat area with the city of Barcelona, Catalonia, Spain. It opened to the public on 5 April 2004 after a weekend when the tram could be used free of charge.

The Trambaix includes three different routes (T1, T2 and T3). The tram route starts at Plaça Francesc Macià in Barcelona to the west of the city and extends west, passing L'Hospitalet de Llobregat, Esplugues de Llobregat, Cornellà de Llobregat, Sant Joan Despí and Sant Just Desvern. An extension of Tram T3 opened on 8 December 2006, as far as Consell Comarcal in Sant Feliu de Llobregat. The yearly ridership of all of its lines combined is of 15,057,318 passengers as of 2008.

The Trambaix complements the Trambesòs that runs to the north-east of the city. Both networks will be interconnected through Avinguda Diagonal in the next construction phase.

T1 Route

 Francesc Macià
 L'Illa
 Numància
 Maria Cristina (L3)
 Pius XII
 Palau Reial (L3)
 Zona Universitària (L3, L9)
 Avinguda de Xile
 Ernest Lluch (L5)
 Can Rigal
 Ca n'Oliveres
 Can Clota
 Pont d'Esplugues
 La Sardana
 Montesa
 El Pedró
 Ignasi Iglésias
 Cornellà Centre (L5)
 Les Aigües
 Fontsanta i Fatjó
 Bon Viatge

T2 Route
 Francesc Macià
 L'Illa
 Numància
 Maria Cristina (L3)
 Pius XII
 Palau Reial (L3)
 Zona Universitària (L3, L9)
 Avinguda de Xile
 Ernest Lluch (L5)
 Can Rigal
 Ca n'Oliveres
 Can Clota
 Pont d'Esplugues
 La Sardana
 Montesa
 El Pedró
 Ignasi Iglésias
 Cornellà Centre (L5)
 Les Aigües
 Fontsanta i Fatjó
 Bon Viatge
 La Fontsanta
 Centre Miquel Martí i Pol
 Sant Martí de l'Erm (Previously called Llevant-Les Planes)

T3 Route
 Francesc Macià
 L'Illa
 Numància
 Maria Cristina (L3)
 Pius XII
 Palau Reial (L3)
 Zona Universitària (L3, L9)
 Avinguda de Xile
 Ernest Lluch (L5)
 Can Rigal
 Ca n'Oliveres
 Can Clota
 Pont d'Esplugues
 La Sardana
 Montesa
 Sant Martí de l'Erm (Previously called Hospital Sant Joan Despi | TV3)
 Rambla Sant Just
 Walden
 Torreblanca
 Sant Feliu-Consell Comarcal

Tram future

Since the modern tram system launched in 2004, the possibility was envisaged to connect Trambaix and Trambesòs. In September 2008 the mayor of Barcelona, Jordi Hereu, said in a TV programme that in the near future (2011–2012) both tram networks would be connected along the Diagonal Avenue. Despite the Generalitat de Catalunya's efforts to promote it, the project remained on hold for over a decade. Finally in January 2019, Barcelona's city council approved the project with support of mayoress Ada Colau.

The project is divided into two phases. Phase 1 extends the Trambesòs network from Glòries to Verdaguer, serving Monumental and Sicília along the way. Monumental will provide an interchange with Line 2 of the Barcelona Metro. Verdaguer will provide an interchange with line 4 and line 5. The route is 1.8km and has a travel time of 7 minutes. This phase entered construction in 2022 and is expected to be operational by 2024. Phase 2 will link Verdaguer with Francesc Macià, thus completing the connection of the two separate tram networks. This section would serve the stations of Diagonal, Balmes and Casanova. Works are expected to begin once phase 1 has been completed.

Network Map

See also
 Barcelona Metro
 List of tram stations in Barcelona
 Trambesòs
 Tramvia Blau

External links

  
 Track plan of the current Barcelona tram system, including the Trambaix
 Unofficial site of tram
 tram in Barcelona

References

 
Trams in Barcelona
Transport in L'Hospitalet de Llobregat
Transport in Esplugues de Llobregat
Transport in Cornellà de Llobregat
Transport in Baix Llobregat
Standard gauge railways in Spain

ca:Tram#Trambaix
de:Straßenbahn Barcelona#Trambaix